Malkapur is a city and a municipal council in Kolhapur district in the Indian state of Maharashtra.

Geography
It has an average elevation of 586 metres (1922 feet).

Demographics
 India census, Malkapur had a population of 5503. Males constitute 51% of the population and females 49%. Malkapur has an average literacy rate of 79%, higher than the national average of 59.5%: male literacy is 84%, and female literacy is 74%. In Malkapur, 12% of the population is under 6 years of age.

References

External links
 Detailed Information about Malkapur

Cities and towns in Kolhapur district